Julien Rose Baker (born September 29, 1995) is an American indie rock singer and guitarist. Her music is noted for its moody quality and confessional lyrical style, as well as frank explorations of issues including spirituality, addiction, mental illness, and human nature.

Born and raised in suburban Memphis, Tennessee, Baker released her debut album Sprained Ankle (2015) while she was a student at Middle Tennessee State University. The album received critical acclaim and appeared on several 2015 year-end lists. Baker subsequently signed to Matador Records and released her second studio album Turn Out the Lights in 2017, to further critical success. Her third album, Little Oblivions (2021), embraced a more full-band sound and became Baker's first top 40 album on the Billboard 200 chart.

In addition to her solo work, Baker is a member of the indie supergroup Boygenius, alongside Phoebe Bridgers and Lucy Dacus. The group's debut eponymous EP was released in October 2018. Boygenius announced their reunion in January of 2023, their debut studio album The Record is set to be released in March.

Early life 
Baker was born on September 29, 1995 in Germantown, and raised in Bartlett, Tennessee, a suburb of Memphis. Her parents both worked in the field of physical therapy. She has spoken of being inspired by her father who, after an accident in his twenties resulting in the amputation of his leg, dedicated his life to making experimental prosthetic limbs. Baker's parents separated while she was in elementary school.

Baker grew up in a devout Baptist family, and her early exposure to music involved playing at her church. After seeing Green Day on television, she was inspired to explore more alternative music and started listening to bands like My Chemical Romance and Death Cab for Cutie. She subsequently became captivated by the punk, hardcore, metalcore, and screamo scenes, and has said some of her favorite bands were MewithoutYou, Underoath, The Chariot, Norma Jean, and Whitechapel. She struggled with substance abuse as a young teen, but found support in the community surrounding house shows in Memphis, and became inspired by the straight edge punk subculture. While in high school in 2010, Baker co-founded the band the Star Killers, who renamed themselves Forrister in 2015.

Baker attended Arlington High School and then Middle Tennessee State University, where she had a campus job in the A/V department and initially studied audio engineering, before switching to literature and secondary education. She eventually left school to tour full-time after the release of Sprained Ankle, but returned to campus in the fall of 2019 to complete her degree in literature.

Career

2015–2017: Early success
During her first year at MTSU, Baker began writing songs on her own, often utilizing the university practice rooms that stayed open late at night. She wrote what would become Sprained Ankle in her dorm room and recorded it on free studio time that a friend of hers had gotten from an internship, and she’s said that she never thought the EP would be heard by a wide audience; she put it on Bandcamp so that her friends could hear it.

It was discovered and picked up by 6131 Records, however, and became the studio album Sprained Ankle which was released in October 2015. Sprained Ankle ended up topping many 2015 year-end lists, and its success led to features in The New Yorker and The New York Times, with various critics calling it "heartbreaking," "hypnotic," and "striking."

In March 2016, Baker gave an NPR Tiny Desk performance, the first of an eventual four appearances at the desk. She also played at that year's South by Southwest and Newport Folk festivals. Her performances from this period have been called "hushed, reverential events," with the audience often remaining quiet and emotional. In 2017 she signed to Matador Records, and released a 7-inch single consisting of the songs "Funeral Pyre" (previously called "Sad Song 11") and "Distant Solar Systems."

Her second album, Turn Out the Lights, was recorded with engineer and producer Calvin Lauber at Ardent Studios in Memphis, and released on October 27, 2017 to further acclaim. She spent the following year touring across the U.S. and internationally, performing alongside artists including The National, Father John Misty, Half Waif, Adam Torres, and Lucy Dacus, and appearing on CBS This Morning and The Late Show with Stephen Colbert.

Baker has opened for or collaborated with a wide range of artists, including Death Cab for Cutie, Conor Oberst, Paramore and Hayley Williams, The National, The Decemberists, Belle & Sebastian, Frightened Rabbit, The Front Bottoms, Touche Amore, Manchester Orchestra, and Bright Eyes. She has also released covers of various songs including those by Elliott Smith, Radiohead, and Soundgarden.

2018–present: Boygenius and Little Oblivions
In 2018, Baker formed the rock supergroup Boygenius with fellow indie singer-songwriters Phoebe Bridgers and Lucy Dacus, both of whom she had toured with previously. The group released three songs in August of that year and subsequently announced an eponymous EP, Boygenius, which was released on October 26, 2018 to widespread critical acclaim. The band spent that November touring the U.S., and performed "Me & My Dog" on Late Night with Seth Meyers. The trio has continued to collaborate on each other’s solo work since the release of their EP, lending backing vocals to two songs from Bridgers’ Grammy-nominated Punisher and “Favor” from Baker’s Little Oblivions, as well as Hayley Williams' Petals for Armor single "Roses/Lotus/Violet/Iris."

In 2019, Baker put out two 7-inch singles. The first, released in June, featured songs "Red Door" and "Conversation Piece," and the second in October featured "Tokyo" and "Sucker Punch" as part of the Sub Pop singles series. All four songs had a slightly more produced sound than her previous work and were received very positively.

On October 21, 2020, Baker announced her third studio album, Little Oblivions, accompanied by the lead single "Faith Healer" and an essay by poet Hanif Abdurraqib. Little Oblivions was released February 26, 2021, and was preceded by additional singles "Hardline" and "Favor." It was written mostly over the course of 2019, a difficult and formative year for Baker as she had to cancel various tour dates, struggled with her sobriety and mental health, and eventually returned to school to finish her degree at MTSU. In January, she appeared on The Late Show with Stephen Colbert, performing "Faith Healer." In 2022, Baker released a B-Side EP to "Little Oblivions" and shared the single "Guthrie".

Artistry

Baker is known for her deeply personal, confessional songwriting, and her music has been categorized as a mix of indie rock, indie folk, alternative, and emo. The sparse arrangements on her “fragile, gentle” 2015 debut, Sprained Ankle, feature only her voice and guitar, and her stage performances often consist of her alone, utilizing a loop pedal. 2017's Turn Out the Lights saw the addition of occasional violin as well as "organs and cavernous-sounding production." Baker experimented with a more full-band sound for her 2021 release Little Oblivions, and has commented on feeling limited by her own expectations to adhere to her established style. The album newly features drums, bass, keyboards, mandolin, and banjo, all played by Baker on the recording. On tour for the album, she has played with a full band and featured new, multi-instrument arrangements of her previous work, describing the band's sound as "post-rock."

Baker’s writing is infused with religious themes, and is often noted for its physical imagery. Hope, redemption, love, addiction, shame, self-loathing, and direct appeals to God are all prominent motifs throughout her work. Her music often features frank explorations of addiction and sobriety, and she has been open in discussing her experiences with substance abuse and mental illness.

Personal life
Baker is a lesbian, and her fraught experiences with organized Christianity inform much of her work. She came out to her parents at age 17, after years of being closeted and watching friends get sent to conversion therapy or kicked out of their homes. However, she found her family was “radically accepting.” She previously referred to herself as a Christian socialist, but has spoken on how being constantly labelled the "sober queer Christian" early in her career was damaging to her understanding of her identity, and led to her questioning and reevaluating many foundational aspects of her life. She has since discussed the ever-changing nature of her relationship to faith, saying she is no longer interested in labeling her beliefs so rigidly and that she is trying to adopt a less dichotomous worldview than the one she was raised with, calling the realization "freeing."

Baker has a deep appreciation for literature and has said that she "love[s] school". She has contributed essays to literary magazines and been known to enjoy discussing philosophy, history, theology, and her hopes of possibly continuing her academic pursuits or becoming a teacher. Interviewers have often remarked on her kind, playful nature and Southern politeness as striking in contrast to the weight of the themes she explores in her music.

Discography

Studio albums

Extended plays

Singles

Guest appearances

As part of Boygenius
 Boygenius (2018)
 Boygenius Demos (2020)
  The Record (2023)

As part of Forrister
 American Blues (2013) (as The Star Killers)
 "Esau" and "Black Poppy Wine" for Little Moses/The Star Killers Split (2014) (as The Star Killers)
 "Choked Up" (2015)

Notes

Awards and nominations

!Ref.
|-
| 2016
|Libera Award
|Sprained Ankle
| Libera Award for Best Breakthrough Artist
| 
| style="text-align:center;" | 
|-
| 2021
|AIM Awards
|Hardline
| Best Independent Video
| 
| style="text-align:center;" |

References

External links

 

1995 births
21st-century American guitarists
21st-century Protestants
21st-century American women singers
American Christian socialists
American women singer-songwriters
American Protestants
Feminist musicians
Christians from Tennessee
Female Christian socialists
Guitarists from Tennessee
American lesbian musicians
LGBT people from Tennessee
LGBT Protestants
American LGBT singers
Living people
Middle Tennessee State University alumni
People from Murfreesboro, Tennessee
Singer-songwriters from Tennessee
Boygenius members
Matador Records artists
American multi-instrumentalists
21st-century American women guitarists
20th-century American LGBT people
21st-century American LGBT people